Bagdonas is a Lithuanian language family name. The word is the Lithuanized form of the Slavic name Bogdan, meaning 'God Given'.

The surname may refer to:
Gediminas Bagdonas (born 1985), Lithuanian road racing cyclist 
Juozas Bagdonas (1911-2005), Lithuanian painter
Brian Bagdonas, American musician, bassist of  Foghorn Stringband
James Bagdonas (James R. Bagdonas, Jim Bagdonas), American cinematographer

Lithuanian-language surnames